La Voz Senior is a Peruvian reality talent show that premiered on August 27 in Latina Television. Based on the reality singing competition The Voice Senior, the series was created by Dutch television producer John de Mol and is part of The Voice franchise. This is La Voz Senior'''s first season on Latina Television, after La Voz Peru and La Voz Kids.

Eva Ayllón and Daniela Darcourt were announced to be part of the coaching panel of the season after serving as coaches on La Voz Perú fourth season, alongside first time coaches Tony Succar and the duo Pimpinela (Joaquín and Lucía Galán). This is the first season of the Peruvian version of the franchise to have a duo coach and chair. Cristian Rivero is the presenter of the show, joined by Karen Schwarz who presents the backstage on the final rounds.

 Teams 
Color key

  Winner
  Runners-up
  Eliminated in the Concerts
  Eliminated in the Playoffs
  Eliminated in the Knockouts
  Stolen in the Battles
  Eliminated in the Battles
  Withdrew

 Week 1: Blind auditions 
Blind auditions started on 27 August. Each coach has three blocks to use during the auditions. At the end of the blinds, each coach must have 24 artists on their team.

 Week 2 

 Week 3 

 Week 4 
 Last blind audtitions 

 Battles 
The battles started airing on 19 September. This is the first-ever version of The Voice Senior to have battles and adapt the "steal" button twist; each coach could steal six artists. In this round, every contestant will choose a song of their choice and will battle their opponent. Battles' winners and stolen artists advance to the next round.

 Week 5 

 Week 6 
 Last battles 

 Knockouts 
The knockouts started airing on 28 September. Each coach divided their teams into groups of three and selected only one artist to advance to the live shows.

 Week 7: Playoffs 
Color key

  Team Daniela
  Team Pimpinela
  Team Eva
  Team Tony
  Saved by her/his coach
  Not saved
  Immune
  Eliminated

 Week 8: Concerts 
Color key

  Team Daniela
  Team Pimpinela
  Team Eva
  Team Tony
  Saved by her/his coach
  Not saved
  Immune
  Eliminated

 Week 9: Finale 
In the finale, the public votes for their favorite artist. The one with the most votes is named the Voice Senior'' of Peru.

Notes

References 

Peruvian television series
2021 Peruvian television seasons